Madavoor  may refer to several places in Kerala, India:

 Madavoor, Kozhikode, a village in Kozhikode district
 Madavoor, Kilimanoor a village in Thiruvananthapuram district